The 2016 European championships of international draughts were held from 18 to 24 October in Izmir, Turkey over 9 rounds Swiss-system tournament. In main program were 29 participants from 11 countries, including, 8 grandmasters, 6 international masters and 9 masters of the FMJD. After main program was competitions in rapid and blitz programs. Average rating 2031.

The winner was Aygul Idrisova, silver was Ksenia Nakhova and third was Matrena Nogovitsyna all from Russia.

Participants

Results

Classics

Rapid

Blitz

References
 European Championship 2016
 Site European Championship in Izmir
 The results of the championship
 Rapid results
 Blitz result

2016 in draughts
2016 Women's
2016 in Turkish sport
International sports competitions hosted by Turkey
Sports competitions in Izmir
October 2016 sports events in Asia
2010s in İzmir